Kavalga Island is an island in the Delarof Islands subgroup of the Andreanof Islands in the Aleutian Islands chain of Alaska. It is located between the islands of Unalga to the west and Ogliuga to the east.

Kavalga is populated by Marmotini (ground squirrels) and sea birds.

References

External links

Delarof Islands
Islands of Alaska
Islands of Unorganized Borough, Alaska